Andres Felipe Arcila Pereira (born 21 June 1994) is a Colombian footballer.

Career

Youth and college 
Arcila played in his native Colombia with CD Itagüí and Rionegro Águilas before joining MLS side Colorado Rapids for a trial in June 2013.

Arcila went on to play three years of college soccer in the United States at Seton Hall University between 2015 and 2017, making 47  appearances, scoring 18 goals and tallying 10 assists.

While at college, Arcila appeared for USL Premier Development League side New York Red Bulls U-23 in 2016.

Professional 
On 8 March 2019, Arcila signed for USL Championship side Rio Grande Valley FC.

References

External links 
  Seton Hall bio

1994 births
Living people
Colombian footballers
Association football midfielders
New York Red Bulls U-23 players
Rio Grande Valley FC Toros players
Seton Hall Pirates men's soccer players
USL Championship players
USL League Two players
Sportspeople from Cartagena, Colombia